Wildflowers is a 1999 drama film directed by Melissa Painter and starring Clea DuVall, Daryl Hannah, Tomas Arana and Eric Roberts. It features former United States Poet Laureate Robert Hass reading some of his own poetry. Filmed in San Francisco and Marin County, California, it was given a limited theatrical release and received a mixed reception from critics.

Premise
Clea DuVall stars as Cally, a 17-year-old who has been raised by her father, not knowing her mother. When Cally meets a mysterious woman called Sabine, she becomes obsessed with her.

Cast
 Clea DuVall as Cally
 Daryl Hannah as Sabine
 Tomas Arana as Wade, Cally's Father
 Eric Roberts as Jacob, Sabine's Lover
 Richard Hillman as Graham
 Eric Yetter as Dylan
 Robert Hass as "Poet"
 John Doe as Teacher
 Sheila Tousey as Martha
 Irene Bedard as Ruby
 James Burnett as The Tailor
 David Graham as "Trip"
 Alan Gelfant as Wolf
 David Wike as Gahad
 Scott Benton as Oliver

Distribution
Wildflowers premiered at the 1999 Cannes Film Festival. It was given a limited theatrical release in the United States on September 1, 2000. In the US it grossed $5,365.

Reception
At the 2000 SXSW Film Festival, Melissa Painter won the SXSW Competition Award for best Narrative Feature. Review website Rotten Tomatoes gave Wildflowers a rating of 57% based on seven reviews. Metacritic gave it a "generally negative" rating of 28% based on seven reviews. In a review for The New York Times, A. O. Scott called the film dreamy and impressionistic, but ultimately empty. He praised Clea DuVall for her "intuitive grasp of emotion". Writing for The Austin Chronicle, Barry Johnson called the film poignant. He praised Painter for her "lyrical, intimate direction" and DuVall for her "impressive, nuanced performance". Christopher Null called the film bizarre and incomprehensible, "utterly hopeless as cinema".

References

External links
 
 

1999 films
1999 drama films
American drama films
1990s English-language films
1990s American films
1999 LGBT-related films
American LGBT-related films